Living It is a  CBBC School drama series, that revolves around school children lives, The first series contained fifteen episodes and the second series fifteen episodes.

Episode list

Series 1

Series 2

References

External links

2000s British children's television series
2005 British television series debuts
2006 British television series endings
BBC children's television shows
English-language television shows